The 1932 season was the twenty-first season for Santos FC.

References

External links
Official Site 

Santos
1932
1932 in Brazilian football